Taojin Station, formerly Garden Hotel Station. during planning, is a station on Line 5 of the Guangzhou Metro It is located under the junction of East Huanshi Road and Taojin Road in the Yuexiu District, near the Garden and Baiyun Hotels. It opened on 28December 2009.

Station layout

Exits

References

Railway stations in China opened in 2009
Guangzhou Metro stations in Yuexiu District